Purley is both a surname and a given name.

People
Notable people with the name include:

David Purley (1945-1985), British race driver
Purley Baker (1858–1924), American Methodist minister

Fictional characters
Purley is the surname of several characters in the 1996 film Secrets & Lies (film)